The Goldfish (Carassius auratus) is a freshwater fish in the family Cyprinidae of order Cypriniformes. It is commonly kept as a pet in indoor aquariums, and is one of the most popular aquarium fish. Goldfish released into the wild have become an invasive pest in parts of North America.

Native to China, the goldfish is a relatively small member of the carp family (which also includes the Prussian carp and the crucian carp). It was first selectively bred for color in imperial China more than 1,000 years ago, where several distinct breeds were developed. Goldfish breeds vary greatly in size, body shape, fin configuration, and coloration (various combinations of white, yellow, orange, red, brown, and black are known).

History

Various species of carp (collectively known as Asian carp) have been bred and reared as food fish for thousands of years in East Asia. Some of these normally gray or silver species have a tendency to produce red, orange or yellow color mutations; this was first recorded in Imperial China, during the Jin dynasty (266–420).

During the Tang dynasty (AD 618–907), it was popular to raise carp in ornamental ponds and water gardens. A natural genetic mutation produced gold (actually yellowish orange) rather than silver coloration. People began to selectively breed the gold variety instead of the silver variety, keeping them in ponds or other bodies of water. On special occasions at which guests were expected, they would be moved to a much smaller container for display.

By the Song dynasty (AD 960–1279), the selective domestic breeding of goldfish was firmly established. In 1162, the empress of the Song dynasty ordered the construction of a pond to collect the red and gold variety. By this time, people outside the imperial family were forbidden to keep goldfish of the gold (yellow) variety, yellow being the imperial color. The occurrence of other colors (apart from red and gold) was first recorded in 1276.

During the Ming dynasty (1368–1644), goldfish also began to be raised indoors, which permitted selection for mutations that would not be able to survive in ponds. The first occurrence of -tailed goldfish was recorded in the Ming dynasty. In 1603, goldfish were introduced to Japan. In 1611, goldfish were introduced to Portugal and from there to other parts of Europe.

During the 1620s, goldfish were highly regarded in southern Europe because of their metallic scales, and symbolized good luck and fortune. It became a tradition for married men to give their wives a goldfish on their first anniversary, as a symbol for the prosperous years to come. This tradition quickly died, as goldfish became more available, losing their status. Goldfish were first introduced to North America around 1850 and quickly became popular in the United States.

Biology

Taxonomy

There has been considerable debate about the taxonomy of the goldfish. Previously, the goldfish was believed to be either a subspecies of the crucian carp (Carassius carassius), or of the Prussian carp (Carassius gibelio). However, modern genetic sequencing has suggested otherwise, and that modern goldfish are domesticated varieties of C. auratus that are native to Southern China. C. auratus are differentiated from other Carassius species by several characteristics. C. auratus have a more pointed snout, while the snout of C. carassius is well rounded. C. gibelio often has a grayish/greenish color, while crucian carp are always golden bronze. Juvenile crucian carp have a black spot on the base of the tail, which disappears with age. In C. auratus, this tail spot is never present. C. auratus have fewer than 31 scales along the lateral line, while crucian carp have 33 scales or more.

Goldfish can hybridize with some other Carassius species of carp. Koi and common carp may also interbreed with goldfish to produce sterile hybrids.

Size

As of April 2008, the largest goldfish in the world was believed by the BBC to measure , in the Netherlands. The secretary of the Federation of British Aquatic Societies (FBAS) stated of Goldie's size, "I would think there are probably a few bigger goldfish that people don't think of as record holders, perhaps in ornamental lakes". On November 16, 2020, a  goldfish weighing  was found in a  lake in Greenville, South Carolina, while conducting a population survey of Oak Grove Lake.

Vision
Goldfish have one of the most studied senses of vision in fishes. Goldfish have four kinds of cone cells, which are respectively sensitive to different colors: red, green, blue and ultraviolet. The ability to distinguish between four different primary colors classifies them as tetrachromats.

Hearing
Goldfish have one of the most studied senses of hearing in fish. They have two otoliths, permitting the detection of sound particle motion, and Weberian ossicles connecting the swimbladder to the otoliths, facilitating the detection of sound pressure.

Reproduction

Goldfish can only grow to sexual maturity with enough water and the right nutrition. Most goldfish breed in captivity, particularly in pond settings. Breeding usually happens after a significant temperature change, often in spring. Males chase gravid female goldfish (females carrying eggs), and prompt them to release their eggs by bumping and nudging them.

Goldfish, like all cyprinids, are egg-layers. Their eggs are adhesive and attach to aquatic vegetation, typically dense plants such as Cabomba or Elodea or a spawning mop. The eggs hatch within 48 to 72 hours.

Within a week or so, the fry begins to assume its final shape, although a year may pass before they develop a mature goldfish color; until then they are a metallic brown like their wild ancestors. In their first weeks of life, the fry grow quickly—an adaptation born of the high risk of getting devoured by the adult goldfish (or other fish and insects) in their environment.

Some highly selectively bred goldfish can no longer breed naturally due to their altered shape. The artificial breeding method called "hand stripping" can assist in breeding, but can harm the fish if not done correctly. In captivity, adults may also eat young that they encounter.

Breeding goldfish by the hobbyist is the process of selecting adult fish to reproduce, allowing them to reproduce and then raising the resulting offspring while continually removing fish that do not approach the desired pedigree.

Respiration
Goldfish are able to survive short periods of entirely anoxic conditions. Survival is shorter under higher temperatures, suggesting that this is a cold weather adaptation. Researchers speculate that this is specifically an adaptation to survival in frozen water bodies over winter.

Energy is obtained from liver glycogen. This process depends upon a pyruvate decarboxylase – the first known in vertebrates.

Salinity
Although they are a freshwater fish, goldfish have been found in brackish water with a salinity of 17.

Behavior

Goldfish are gregarious, displaying schooling behavior, as well as displaying the same types of feeding behaviors. Goldfish may display similar behaviors when responding to their reflections in a mirror.

Goldfish have learned behaviors, both as groups and as individuals, that stem from native carp behavior. They are a generalist species with varied feeding, breeding, and predator avoidance behaviors that contribute to their success. As fish, they can be described as "friendly" towards each other. Very rarely does a goldfish harm another goldfish, nor do the males harm the females during breeding. The only real threat that goldfish present to each other is competing for food. Commons, comets, and other faster varieties can easily eat all the food during a feeding before  varieties can reach it. This can lead to stunted growth or possible starvation of fancier varieties when they are kept in a pond with their single-tailed brethren. As a result, care should be taken to combine only breeds with similar body type and swim characteristics.

Cognitive abilities

Goldfish have strong associative learning abilities, as well as social learning skills. In addition, their visual acuity allows them to distinguish between individual humans. Owners may notice that fish react favorably to them (swimming to the front of the glass, swimming rapidly around the tank, and going to the surface mouthing for food) while hiding when other people approach the tank. Over time, goldfish learn to associate their owners and other humans with food, often "begging" for food whenever their owners approach.

Goldfish that have constant visual contact with humans also stop considering them to be a threat. After being kept in a tank for several weeks, sometimes months, it becomes possible to feed a goldfish by hand without it shying away.

Goldfish have a memory-span of at least three months and can distinguish between different shapes, colors, and sounds. By using positive reinforcement, goldfish can be trained to recognize and to react to light signals of different colors or to perform tricks. Fish respond to certain colors most evidently in relation to feeding. Fish learn to anticipate feedings provided they occur at around the same time every day.

Classification

Western

As with many other examples of animal , selective breeding of Goldfish over centuries has produced several color variations, some of them far removed from the "golden" color of the original fish. There are also different body shapes, and fin and eye configurations. Some extreme versions of the goldfish live only in aquariums—they are much less hardy than varieties closer to the "wild" original. However, some variations are hardier, such as the Shubunkin. Currently, there are about 300 breeds recognized in China. The vast majority of goldfish breeds today originated from China. Some of the main varieties are:

Chinese
Chinese tradition classifies goldfish into four main types. These classifications are not commonly used in the West.
 Crucian (also called "grass") — Goldfish without  anatomical features, similar to Crucian carp or grass carp except for their coloration. These include the common goldfish, comet goldfish and Shubunkin.
 Wen — Goldfish having a  tail, e.g., Fantails and Veiltails ("Wen" is also the name of the characteristic headgrowth on such strains as Oranda and Lionhead)
 Dragon Eye — Goldfish having extended eyes, e.g., Black Moor, Bubble Eye, and Telescope Eye
 Egg — Goldfish having no dorsal fin, usually with an 'egg-shaped' body, e.g., Lionhead. This group includes a Bubble Eye without a dorsal fin.

Cultivation

In aquaria
Like most species in the carp family, goldfish produce a large amount of waste both in their feces and through their gills, releasing harmful chemicals into the water. Build-up of this waste to toxic levels can occur in a relatively short period of time, and can easily cause a goldfish's death. The water surface area determines how much oxygen diffuses and dissolves into the water. A general rule is have . Active aeration by way of a water pump, filter or fountain effectively increases the surface area.

The goldfish is classified as a coldwater fish, and can live in unheated aquaria at a temperature comfortable for humans. However, rapid changes in temperature (for example in an office building in winter when the heat is turned off at night) can kill them, especially if the tank is small. Care must also be taken when adding water, as the new water may be of a different temperature. Extremely high temperatures (over ) can also harm goldfish. However, higher temperatures may help fight protozoan infestations by accelerating the parasite's life-cycle—thus eliminating it more quickly.

Like all fish, goldfish do not like to be petted. In fact, touching a goldfish can endanger its health, because it can cause the protective slime coat to be damaged or removed, exposing the fish's skin to infection from bacteria or water-born parasites. However, goldfish respond to people by surfacing at feeding time, and can be trained or acclimated to taking pellets or flakes from human fingers. The reputation of goldfish dying quickly is often due to poor care. The lifespan of goldfish in captivity can extend beyond 10 years.

If left in the dark for a period of time, goldfish gradually change color until they are almost gray. Goldfish produce pigment in response to light, similarly to how human skin becomes tanned in the sun. Fish have cells called chromatophores that produce pigments which reflect light, and give the fish coloration. The color of a goldfish is determined by which pigments are in the cells, how many pigment molecules there are, and whether the pigment is grouped inside the cell or is spaced throughout the cytoplasm.

Because goldfish eat live plants, their presence in a planted aquarium can be problematic. Only a few aquarium plant species (for example Cryptocoryne and Anubias) can survive around goldfish, but they require special attention so that they are not uprooted. Plastic plants are more durable.

In ponds

Goldfish are popular pond fish, since they are small, inexpensive, colorful and very hardy. In an outdoor pond or water garden, they may even survive for brief periods if ice forms on the surface, as long as there is enough oxygen remaining in the water and the pond does not freeze solid. Common, London and Bristol shubunkins, jikin, wakin, comet and some hardier fantail goldfish can be kept in a pond all year round in temperate and subtropical climates. Moor, veiltail, oranda and lionhead can be kept safely in outdoor ponds year-round only in more tropical climates and only in summer elsewhere.

Compatible fish include rudd, tench, orfe and koi, but the last require specialized care. Ramshorn snails are helpful by eating any algae that grows in the pond. Without some form of animal population control, goldfish ponds can easily become overstocked. Fish such as orfe consume goldfish eggs.

Ponds small and large are fine in warmer areas (although it ought to be noted that goldfish can "overheat" in small volumes of water in the summer in tropical climates). In frosty climes, the depth should be at least  to preclude freezing. During winter, goldfish become sluggish, stop eating and often stay on the bottom of the pond. This is normal; they become active again in the spring. Unless the pond is large enough to maintain its own ecosystem without interference from humans, a filter is important to clear waste and keep the pond clean. Plants are essential as they act as part of the filtration system, as well as a food source for the fish. Plants are further beneficial since they raise oxygen levels in the water.

Like their wild ancestors, common and comet goldfish as well as shubunkin can survive, and even thrive, in any climate that can support a pond, whereas  goldfish are unlikely to survive in the wild as their bright colors and long fins make them easy prey.

Feeding

In the wild, the diet of goldfish consists of crustaceans, insects, and various plant matter. Like most fish, they are opportunistic feeders and do not stop eating on their own accord. Overfeeding can be deleterious to their health, typically by blocking the intestines. This happens most often with selectively bred goldfish, which have a convoluted intestinal tract. When excess food is available, they produce more waste and feces, partly due to incomplete protein digestion. Overfeeding can sometimes be diagnosed by observing feces trailing from the fish's cloaca.

Goldfish-specific food has less protein and more carbohydrate than conventional fish food. Enthusiasts may supplement this diet with shelled peas (with outer skins removed), blanched green leafy vegetables, and bloodworms. Young goldfish benefit from the addition of brine shrimp to their diet. As with all animals, goldfish preferences vary.

For mosquito control
Like some other popular aquarium fish, such as the guppy, goldfish and other carp are frequently added to stagnant bodies of water to reduce mosquito populations. They are used to prevent the spread of West Nile virus, which relies on mosquitoes to migrate. However, introducing goldfish has often had negative consequences for local ecosystems.

Market
The market for live goldfish and other crucian carp usually imported from China was $1.2million in 2018. Some high quality varieties cost between $125 to $300.

Welfare concerns 

Fishbowls are detrimental to the health of goldfish and are prohibited by animal welfare legislation in several municipalities. The practice of using bowls as permanent fish housing originated from a misunderstanding of Chinese "display" vessels: goldfish which were normally housed in ponds were, on occasion, temporarily displayed in smaller containers to be better admired by guests.

Goldfish kept in bowls or "mini-aquariums" suffer from death, disease, and stunting, due primarily to the low oxygen and very high ammonia/nitrite levels inherent in such an environment. In comparison to other common aquarium fish, goldfish have high oxygen needs and produce a large amount of waste due to the fact they lack a stomach; therefore they require a substantial volume of well-filtered water to thrive. In addition, all goldfish varieties have the potential to reach  in total length, with single-tailed breeds often exceeding . Single-tailed varieties include common and comet goldfish.

In many countries, carnival and fair operators commonly give goldfish away in plastic bags as prizes. In late 2005 Rome banned the use of goldfish and other animals as carnival prizes. Rome has also banned the use of "goldfish bowls", on animal cruelty grounds, as well as Monza, Italy, in 2004. In the United Kingdom, the government proposed banning this practice as part of its Animal Welfare Bill, though this has since been amended to only prevent goldfish being given as prizes to unaccompanied minors.

In Japan, during summer festivals and religious holidays (ennichi), a traditional game called goldfish scooping is played, in which a player scoops goldfish from a basin with a special scooper. Sometimes bouncy balls are substituted for goldfish.

Although edible and closely related to some fairly widely eaten species, goldfish are rarely eaten. A fad among American college students for many years was swallowing goldfish as a stunt and as a fraternity initiation process. The first recorded instance was in 1939 at Harvard University. The practice gradually fell out of popularity over the course of several decades and is rarely practiced today.

Some animal advocates have called for boycotts of goldfish purchases, citing industrial farming and low survival rates of the fish.

In popular culture 

In Chinese history, goldfish was seen "as a symbol of luck and fortune". Moreover, only members of the Song dynasty could own goldfish. In Iran and among the international Iranian diaspora, goldfish is a traditional part of Nowruz celebrations. Goldfish is usually used in Haft-sin table as the symbol of progress.

See also
 Aquaculture
 List of goldfish varieties

References

External links

 
 
 Goldfish Types — Description of 50 plus varieties of goldfish with pictures
 Bristol Aquarists' Society: Goldfish — Photographs and descriptions of the different goldfish varieties

 
Fish described in 1758
Taxa named by Carl Linnaeus
Carassius
Fishkeeping